Binnenstad (English: Inner city) is a neighborhood of Amsterdam, Netherlands located in the Centrum borough. It is divided between the Burgwallen Oude Zijde (east) and Burgwallen Nieuwe Zijde (west) areas.

Landmarks
It is the most central part of the municipality, comprising the Amsterdam Centraal station, Nieuwe Kerk, Basilica of St. Nicholas, Portuguese Synagogue, Waterlooplein, Openbare Bibliotheek Amsterdam, Dam Square, Begijnhof, Ons' Lieve Heer op Solder, Spui, Muntplein, Beurs van Berlage, Damrak, Oude Kerk, Magna Plaza and Royal Palace of Amsterdam.

External links

 Historic Sites in Binnenstad (Amsterdam) on Trip Advisor.
 amsterdambinnenstad.nl (in Dutch)

Neighbourhoods of Amsterdam